There have been two baronetcies created for persons with the surname Brograve, one in the Baronetage of England and one in the Baronetage of Great Britain. Both creations are extinct.

The Brograve Baronetcy, of Hamells in the County of Hertford, was created in the Baronetage of England on 18 March 1663 for Thomas Brograve. The title became extinct on the death of the third Baronet in 1707.

The Brograve Baronetcy, of Worstead House in the County of Norfolk, was created in the Baronetage of Great Britain on 28 July 1791 for Berney Brograve. The title became extinct upon the death of the second Baronet in 1828. George Augustus Rye, nephew of Sir George, the second Baronet (son of his half-sister Ann Brograve), changed his last name to Brograve by Royal Licence three years after Sir George's death, in the hope of having the baronetcy revived in his person, but his application was denied in 1831.

Brograve baronets, of Hamells (1663)
Sir Thomas Brograve, 1st Baronet (died 1670)
Sir John Brograve, 2nd Baronet (1664–1691)
Sir Thomas Brograve, 3rd Baronet (1670–1707)

Brograve baronets, of Worstead (1791)
Sir Berney Brograve, 1st Baronet (1726–1797)
Sir George Berney Brograve, 2nd Baronet (1772–1828)

Notes

References 
 Obituary, Sir G.B Brograve, Annual Register p. 236 - Charles William Wason 1828

Extinct baronetcies in the Baronetage of England
Extinct baronetcies in the Baronetage of Great Britain
1663 establishments in England